Alexander Steel (25 July 1886 – 1954) was a Scottish professional footballer who played for Newmilns, Ayr, Manchester City, Tottenham Hotspur, Barcelona, Kilmarnock, Southend United and Gillingham. In his spell at Barcelona he won two Pyrenees Cups in 1912 and 1913.

Football career 
Steel began his career at local non-league club Newmilns before joining Ayr. In 1905 he joined Manchester City and made 32 league and FA Cup appearances for the Hyde Road club, scoring only once. The right half signed for Tottenham Hotspur in 1908 and played in one first-team match in his three years with Spurs.

After playing a few games back in his native Ayrshire with Kilmarnock, Steel joined FC Barcelona during the 1911–12 season and quickly became one of the club's benchmarks, netting 56 goals in just 43 matches. At Barça he won two Pyrenees Cups in 1912 and 1913, scoring once in the quarter-finals of the former and netting a hat-trick in the quarter-finals of the latter, and even though he did not found the back of the net again in the 1913 edition, his hat-trick alone was enough to make him the tournament's shared top scorer alongside Frank Allack. After leaving Barcelona he had spells in England at Southend United and finally Gillingham, where he played the 1919–20 Southern Football League season as a defender before ending his playing career.

His brothers Danny and Bobby were also footballers, both having a significant association with Tottenham Hotspur; the three siblings played together in one Football League fixture against Bradford City in January 1910, Alex's only league appearance for the club. Alex later recommended Bobby as a signing for Gillingham.

Honours
Barcelona
Pyrenees Cup: 1912, 1913

References 

1886 births
1954 deaths
Scottish footballers
Footballers from East Ayrshire
English Football League players
Ayr F.C. players
Manchester City F.C. players
Tottenham Hotspur F.C. players
Kilmarnock F.C. players
Southend United F.C. players
Gillingham F.C. players
Association football wing halves
Scottish Football League players
Scottish Junior Football Association players
Southern Football League players 
Scotland junior international footballers
FC Barcelona players
Scottish expatriate sportspeople in Spain
Scottish expatriate footballers
Expatriate footballers in Spain